Airag Lake is a lake in western Mongolia in the Great Lakes Depression. It is in a system of the interconnected lakes: Khar-Us, Khar, Dörgön, and Khyargas.

The lake was in the same basin as the Khyargas Lake in ancient times.

The depth of the lake generally varies with the inflow river flow. The lake flows into Khyargas Lake along a 5 km long, 200–300 m wide canal, which does not freeze in winter.

In summer, the lake warms up almost to the very bottom. Even in winter, the temperature remains fairly constant, 1 - 2.5 °C. Compared to other lakes, the water is not very clear.

References 

Lakes of Mongolia
Ramsar sites in Mongolia